Hate Rock 'n' Roll is the third compilation of B-sides and rare tracks by Scottish alternative rock band The Jesus and Mary Chain.

Track listing
All songs written by Jim Reid and William Reid, except where noted.
CD (9-43043-2)
 "I Hate Rock 'n' Roll" (W. Reid) – 3:43
 "Snakedriver" – 3:42
 "Something I Can't Have" – 3:01
"Bleed Me" (J. Reid) – 3:37
"33" (J. Reid) – 3:17
"Lost Star" (W. Reid) – 2:05
 "Penetration" – 2:47
 "New York City" (W. Reid) – 1:58
 "Taking It Away" (Ben Lurie) – 2:11
 "I'm in With the Out Crowd" (J. Reid)
 "Little Stars" (W. Reid) – 2:36
 "Teenage Lust " – 3:32
 "Perfect Crime" (W. Reid) – 1:34

Original releases
 Tracks 1, 4, 5, 6: Single "I Hate Rock 'n' Roll" from 1995
 Tracks 2, 3: E.P. Sound of Speed from 1993
 Track 7: B-side to "Blues from a Gun" from 1989
 Tracks 8, 9: B-sides to "Come On" from 1994
 Tracks 11, 13: B-sides to "Sometimes Always" from 1994
 Track 12: remix of track from Honey's Dead from 1992

Personnel

The Jesus and Mary Chain
 Jim Reid – vocals, guitar, production
 William Reid – vocals, guitar, production, engineer (track 7)
 Ben Lurie – bass
 Nick Sanderson – drums (tracks 1 to 6)
 Steve Monti – drums (tracks 9 to 11)

Additional personnel
 Dick Meaney – engineer (tracks 1 to 6, 11)
 Nick Addison – engineer (tracks 8 to 10)
 Martin Schmeize – engineer (track 12)

References

The Jesus and Mary Chain compilation albums
B-side compilation albums
1995 compilation albums